Frederick Carl Westfahl Jr. (January 17, 1876 - October 25, 1967) was a member of the Wisconsin State Assembly.

Biography
Westfahl was born on January 17, 1876, in Milwaukee, Wisconsin. His former home, now known as the Frederick C. Westfahl, Jr. House, is located in the West Washington-North Hi-Mount Boulevards Historic District.

Career
Westfahl was elected to the Assembly in 1902. He was a Republican.

References

External links
The Political Graveyard

1876 births
1967 deaths
Politicians from Milwaukee
Republican Party members of the Wisconsin State Assembly